Pierre Cassignard (19 December 1965 – 20 December 2021) was a French stage and screen actor.

Early life
Pierre Cassignard was born in Sainte-Foy-la-Grande in Grionde, France, on 19 December 1965. In the early 1980s, he moved to Paris to study theater, but wound up working in a production a few days later. He landed his first role in the play House & Garden in 1987. Television and Film followed quickly when he was cast in the TV series Haute Tension in 1988.

Cassignard was well received. In 1996, he won the coveted Moliere for Best Actor in the Carlo Goldoni play The Venetian Twins. He was also nominated as Best Newcomer for the same role. A second Best Actor nomination came in 2005, again for a Carlo  Goldoni play, the Mistress of the Inn.

Theater

Filmography

Death
Monsieur Cassignard suffered from cancer prior to his death.  He died on 20 December 2021, just one day after his 56th birthday.

References

External links 
 

1965 births
2021 deaths
French male film actors
French male television actors
French male stage actors
20th-century French male actors
21st-century French male actors
People from Gironde